Abdullah ibn Salam, born Al-Husayn ibn Salam, was a companion of the Islamic prophet Muhammad, and was a Jew who converted to Islam. He participated in the conquest of Syria and Palestine, but died in Medina.

Biography

Early years
Abdullah ibn Salam was a Jew in Yathrib who belonged to the Banu Qaynuqa tribe , claiming descent from Joseph. He was widely respected and honored by the people of the city, even those who were not Jewish. He was known for his piety and goodness, his upright conduct, and his truthfulness.

Abdullah ibn Salam lived a peaceful and gentle life but he was serious, purposeful and organized in the way he spent his time. For a fixed period each day, he would worship, teach and preach in the synagogue.

Then he would spend some time in his orchard, looking after date palms, pruning and pollinating.  Thereafter, to increase his understanding and knowledge of his religion, he would devote himself to the study of the Torah.

In this study, it is said he was particularly struck by some verses of the Torah which dealt with the coming of a prophet who would complete the message of previous prophets. Abdullah ibn Salam therefore took an immediate and keen interest when he heard reports of the appearance of a prophet in Mecca. He used to stop at certain passages in the Torah and ponder a long time upon the news therein of the prophet who was to appear to complete the Message of all the prophets before him. The more he read the more he became convinced that the foretold prophet was Muhammad who appeared among his people in Mecca.

Conversion of Abdullah
In 622, Muhammad left Mecca for Medina. When he reached Medina and stopped at Quba, a man came rushing into the city, calling out to people and announcing the arrival of Muhammad. On hearing the news, Abdullah ibn Salam exclaimed the Shahadah (Testimony of faith that there is only one God and Muhammad is His Messenger) and told his aunt, who was sitting nearby: "Aunt, he is really, by God, the brother of Moses and follows his religion". Tradition recounts Abdullah's early life in his own words:"When I heard of the appearance of the Messenger of God (peace be upon him) I began to make enquiries about his name, his genealogy, his characteristics, his time and place and I began to compare this information with what is contained in our books. From these enquiries, I became convinced about the authenticity of his prophethood and I affirmed the truth of his mission.  However, I concealed my conclusions from the Jews.  I held my tongue.

Then came the day when the Prophet, peace be upon him, left Makkah and headed for Yathrib.  When he reached Yathrib and stopped at Quba, a man came rushing into the city, calling out to people and announcing the arrival of the Prophet.

At that moment, I was at the top of a palm tree doing some work.  My aunt, Khalidah bint Al-Harith, was sitting under the tree.  On hearing the news, I shouted: “Allahu Akbar! Allahu Akbar!” (God is Great! God is Great!)

When my aunt heard me, she remonstrated with me: “May God frustrate you...  By God, if you had heard that Moses was coming you would not have been more enthusiastic.”

“Auntie, he is really, by God, the ‘brother’ of Moses and follows his religion.  He was sent with the same mission as Moses.” She was silent for a while and then said: “Is he the Prophet about whom you spoke to us who would be sent to confirm the truth preached by previous (Prophets) and complete the message of his Lord?”

“Yes,” I replied. Without any delay or hesitation, Abdullah went out to meet the Prophet. He saw crowds of people at his door. I moved about in the crowds until I reached close to him. The first words I heard him say were: 'O people! Spread peace...Share food...Pray during the night while people sleep... and you will enter Paradise in peace...' I looked at him closely. I scrutinized him and was convinced that his face was not that of an imposter. I went closer to him and made the declaration of faith that there is no god but God and that Muhammad is the Messenger of God. The Prophet turned to me and asked: 'What is your name?' 'Al-Husayn ibn Salam,' I replied. 'Instead, it is (now) Abdullah ibn Salam,' he said (giving me a new name). 'Yes,' I agreed. 'Abdullah ibn Salam (it shall be). By Him who has sent you with the Truth, I do not wish to have another name after this day.' I returned home and introduced Islam to my wife, my children and the rest of my household.

In the Qur'an
Reportedly the Qur'an implicitly mentions Abdullah ibn Salam, "Say, 'Have you considered: if the Qur'an was from Allah, and you disbelieved in it while a witness from the Children of Israel has testified to something similar and believed while you were arrogant?' Indeed, Allah does not guide the wrongdoing people" (Qur'an, 46:10). Tafsir al-Jalalayn mentions in its exegesis of this verse that the "witness" in the verse refers to Abdullah ibn Salam.

Promise to Abdullah
Abdullah ibn Salam was the first Muslim that was promised Paradise while he was still alive. In a Hadith, it was reported that one day while Muhammad was sitting with the best of his companions, he said "Do you want to see a man walking on Earth and in Paradise?" Each one of the companions looked in silence towards Muhammad hoping he would mention their name. Muhammad pointed in the distance and the companions saw he was looking towards Abdullah ibn Salam.

Death
He died in 663.

Non Muslim view
Although some Muslim sources claim that he converted immediately after Muhammad’s arrival to Medina, non-Muslim scholars give more credence to other Muslim sources that indicate 630 as the year of Ibn Salam’s conversion.

As recorded in a fragment found in the Cairo Geniza, ibn Salam was allegedly part of a group of ten Jewish elders who prepared the Quran for Muhammad and encoded a messaging condemning Muhammad within the text. This story was part of a Jewish counter-narrative to the Quran, originating as an oral story and intended to undermine the claim that Islam and the Quran had superseded Judaism. Ultimately this counter narrative proved false as the verses which allegedly encode an anti-Muhammad message do not actually appear in the Quran.

See also

Masa'il Abdallah ibn Salam
Salaf
Sahaba
List of non-Arab Sahaba
Sunni view of the Sahaba
Jewish tribes of Arabia

References

Further reading

External links
Biography from MSA West Compendium of Muslim Texts.

Sahabah hadith narrators
Isra'iliyyat narrators
Converts to Islam from Judaism
Year of birth unknown
630s deaths
Banu Qurayza